The 2019–20 season is 27th season in the top Ukrainian football league for FC Karpaty Lviv. Karpaty has competed in Premier League, Ukrainian Cup.

Players

Squad information

Transfers

In

Out

Pre-season and friendlies

Competitions

Overall

Premier League

League table

Relegation round

Results summary

Results by round

Matches

Relegation round

 UPL directed for matches to be held behind closed doors after Government of Ukraine banned all public events of 200 or more people due to coronavirus pandemic.
 Matches postponed because 25 Karpaty players and personnel tested positive for COVID-19.
 Match postponed because 2 Olimpik players tested positive for COVID-19.
 Karpaty didn't arrive due to financial difficulties. Victory awarded to FC Mariupol.
 Karpaty were expelled from the league after failing to appear in two consecutive games. Victories in remaining matches awarded to their opponents.

Ukrainian Cup

Statistics

Appearances and goals

|-
! colspan=16 style=background:#dcdcdc; text-align:center| Goalkeepers

|-
! colspan=16 style=background:#dcdcdc; text-align:center| Defenders

|-
! colspan=16 style=background:#dcdcdc; text-align:center| Midfielders 

|-
! colspan=16 style=background:#dcdcdc; text-align:center| Forwards

|-
! colspan=16 style=background:#dcdcdc; text-align:center| Players transferred out during the season

Last updated: 27 June 2020

Goalscorers

Last updated: 27 June 2020

Clean sheets

Last updated: 8 March 2020

Disciplinary record

Last updated: 27 June 2020

References

External links
 Official website

Karpaty Lviv
FC Karpaty Lviv seasons